Trond Førde Eriksen is a Norwegian handball player.

He made his debut on the Norwegian national team in 1997, and played 27 matches for the national team between 1997 and 2001. He competed at the 1999 and the 2001 World Men's Handball Championship.

References

Year of birth missing (living people)
Living people
Norwegian male handball players